The 2010 McGrath Cup is a Gaelic football competition played by the teams of Munster GAA. The competition differs from the Munster Senior Football Championship as it also features further education colleges and the winning team does not progress to another tournament at All-Ireland level.  Originally, the preliminary round was due to be played on the first weekend on January. However,  due to inclement weather and unplayable pitches, the matches were postponed several times, finally being played on 16 January 2010.

McGrath Cup

Preliminary round

Quarter-finals

Semi-finals

Final

See also
 2010 Dr McKenna Cup

References

McGrath Cup
McGrath Cup